Francis Eliot may refer to:

 Francis Perceval Eliot (1755–1818), English soldier, auditor, and man of letters
 Francis Breynton Eliot (1781–1855), military officer

See also
 Francis Elliot (1851–1940), British diplomat
 Francis Elliott (disambiguation)
 Frances Reed Elliot (1892–1965), American nurse